Dubosc may refer to:

 André Dubosc (1866–1935), French stage and film actor
 Catherine Dubosc (born 1959), French operatic soprano
 Claude Dubosc (1682–1745?), French engraver
 Franck Dubosc (born 1963), French actor, comedian and stand-up artist
 Gaston Dubosc (1861–1941), French stage and film actor

See also
 Duboscq

Surnames of Norman origin